Olga Ilyin, a pen name for Olga Baratynskaya or Olga Alexandrovna Boratynskaya (8 August 1894 (N.S.)-6 November 1991) was a Russian-born American poet and novelist. Her works were published in Russian, German and English.

Life

Olga, called Lita by her relatives, was born at Gorky Street in Kazan in prosperous circumstances. At the turn of the century, this manor was one of the spiritual and cultural centers of the city. Her father was a lawyer and a member of the City Duma. In 1906 Grigory Rasputin suddenly paid a visit to the Baratynsky family and told them he could read people's mind.

Her father arranged a room in good hotel, but when he came back the next day, Rasputin found the doors locked. She met him again in Saint Petersburg visiting her aunt Anna Dmitrievna Shipova, but escaped to her room. Her description of Rasputin and his behavior is a small but no doubt valuable contribution to history. For several years in a row Lita came to the capital in Summer and got acquainted with the intricacies of court life and court etiquette, met with Princess Eugenia Maximilianovna of Leuchtenberg and other members of the House of Oldenburg. 

Around the age of 14, illness led to visits with her aunt Katya to Davos, where she was recovering. Back after more than a year, attending Mariinsky women's gymnasium, the medical faculty of Kazan University and Higher Women's Courses she began writing poetry. The first publications were made in the Kazan magazine "Life" (1913). She met with colonel Kirill Borisovich Ilyin, since July 1914 a hussar of the Pavlograd regiment. When World War I broke out, she joined the Red Cross. On 16 February 1917 they married and had a child named Boris. During the Kazan Operation the city was attacked by the Red Army; a third of the population left. Olga moved out with a 9-days-old baby. 

She traveled separately from her husband by train to Kurgan in the Ural Mountains and was arrested while somewhere in Siberia.  In Krasnoyarsk, the refugees were cut off from the fighting units. She lived there for five months and in May 1920 she returned with her son to Kazan. In December 1920 her husband arrived in Harbin, where thousands of Russian Émigrés gathered. In 1922, she succeeded in reaching this fashionable and booming Chinese city. They were eventually able to emigrate to the United States early 1923. They settled in San Rafael, California, where she became a shopkeeper, and sold beads and women dresses. In SF she soon joined a literary circle. In 1925 some of her poems were published.  In 1930 she a became a novelist. Her husband became one of the painters of the new Golden Gate Bridge, which opened in 1937. They lived at the end of Clay Street near Presidio of San Francisco.

Her first novel in English, Dawn of the Eighth Day, is about Nita Ogarin, an aristocratic daughter who marries an army officer soon killed in the Bolshevik Revolution. Her second novel, St. Petersburg Affair, is set in the 1850s. Kyra Beherev, an aristocratic heiress, agrees to marry Count Anatole Melin to appease her aunt, Princess Shubalov. The couple initially decides to remain abstinent and divorce within a year, but they consume their marriage, only to have affairs with other people later. Her third novel, White Road: A Russian Odyssey, is about an aristocratic heiress who decides to flee Russia during the Bolshevik Revolution. In 2014 Visits to the Imperial Court she recounts her experiences as a young girl.

Selected works

References

Note

External links
Works by Olga Ilyin on the Internet Archive

White Russian emigrants to the United States
Writers from San Francisco
20th-century Russian novelists
20th-century American novelists
1894 births
1991 deaths